This table displays the top-rated primetime television series of the 1962–63 season as measured by Nielsen Media Research.

References

1962 in American television
1963 in American television
1962-related lists
1963-related lists
Lists of American television series